James King (born 31 March 1986) is a Scottish rugby union player who plays for Edinburgh Rugby in the Pro14.

Background

He has also represented Scotland at under-18, under-19 and under-21 level and was educated at Berwick High School. He has had spells with both Border Reivers and L'Aquila, the outfit from central Italy.

King scored his first try for the club away to Connacht in April 2011, and followed this up by signing a two-year contract extension four days later.

References 

1986 births
Living people
Edinburgh Rugby players
Border Reivers players
Scottish rugby union players
Rugby union centres